NNM can stand for:

 the IATA code for the Naryan-Mar Airport
 Network Node Manager, a component of HP OpenView
 Network for New Music, founded by Joseph Waters and Linda Reichert no kkk kllll
 in Vehicle registration plates of Japan, the abbreviation for Matsumoto, in the Nagano prefecture
 in Vehicle registration plateslOaof Poland, the abbreviation for Nowe Miasto Lubawskie
 net new money, in the field of Assets under management
 Nordic Network Meeting, a conference in the Erasmus Student Network#Northern European Platform
 NASDAQ National Market, a stock market